Exhyalanthrax afer is a member of the fly family Bombyliidae first described by Johan Christian Fabricius in 1794.

Biology
Larvae feed on pupae of tachinid and ichneumonid parasitoids of the pine processionary caterpillar, Thaumetopoea pityocampa. The pupae of other Lepidoptera and from cocoons of the pine sawfly, Neodiprion sertifer. Adults are most often seen visiting flowers to feed on nectar.

Distribution
Afrotropical: Chad, Eritrea, Ghana, Kenya, Yemen. Oriental: Pakistan. Palaearctic: Afghanistan, Armenia, Austria, Azerbaijan, Belgium, Bulgaria, China (Beijing, Nei Monggol, Sichuan, Xinjiang, Xizang), Croatia, Cyprus, Czech Republic, Denmark, Egypt, France (incl. Corsica), Germany, Gibraltar, Greece (incl. Lesbos), Gruzia, Hungary, Iran, Israel, Italy (incl. Sardinia, Sicily), Kazakhstan, Kyrgyz Republic, Libya, Macedonia, Malta, Mongolia, Morocco, Netherlands, Oman, Poland, Portugal, Romania, Russia (WS), Saudi Arabia, Slovakia, Slovenia, Spain (incl. Ibiza, Mallorca), Switzerland, Tajikistan, Turkey, Turkmenistan, Ukraine, United Arab Emirates, Uzbekistan, Yugoslavia,

References

Bombyliidae
Diptera of Europe
Diptera of Africa
Diptera of Asia
Taxa named by Johan Christian Fabricius
Insects described in 1794